"Kiss 'Em All" is a song recorded by Canadian country music group Lace. It was released in 2000 as the third single from their debut album, Lace. It peaked at number 6 on the RPM Country Tracks chart in May 2000.

Chart performance

References

1999 songs
2000 singles
Lace (band) songs
143 Records singles
Songs written by Bob Regan
Song recordings produced by David Foster
Songs written by Jeff Pennig